Three Lakes Valley can refer to:
 Fountain Valley (British Columbia) (officially Three Lake Valley)
 Three Lakes Valley (Nevada)
 Three Lakes Valley (South Orkney Islands)
 Martin Valley, South Georgia (unofficial local name)